The Six Vilayets (Vilâyat-ı Sitte), the Six Provinces, or the Six Armenian Vilayets ( Vets' haykakan vilayet'ner) refer to the main Armenian-populated vilayets ("provinces") of the Ottoman Empire. These were Van, Erzurum, Mamuret-ul-Aziz, Bitlis, Diyarbekir and  Sivas.

Name
The term Six Vilayets was a diplomatic usage referring to the Ottoman vilayets with substantial Armenian populations. European diplomats often referred to the Six Armenian Vilayets during the Congress of Berlin in 1878.

Population

Ethnic groups

Statistical analysis of the racial elements in the Ottoman provinces by the Armenian Patriarch of Constantinople, 1912

Note: The analysis excludes certain portions of these provinces where Armenians are only a minor element. These portions are as follows: Hakkiari, in the Vilayet of Van; the south of Sairt, in the Vilayet of Bitlis; the south of the Vilayet of Diyarbekir; the south of Malatia, in the Vilayet of Mamuret-ul-Aziz; the north-west and west of the Vilayet of Sivas.

Ottoman official population statistics, 1914

Note: The Ottoman population statistics doesn't give information for separate Muslim ethnic groups such as the Turks, Kurds, Circassians, etc.

The official Ottoman population statistics of 1914 that were based on an earlier census underestimated the number of ethnic minorities, including the number of Armenians. The Ottoman figures didn't define any ethnic groups, only religious ones. So the “Armenian” population as counted by the authorities only tallied ethnic Armenians who were also adherents of the Armenian Apostolic Church. Ethnic Armenians who professed the Muslim faith, which by that time had grown in number, were counted only as “Muslims” (not as Armenian Muslims or Armenians), while Armenian Protestants, just as Pontic Greeks, Caucasus Greeks, and Laz, were counted as "others".

Largest cities
All figures are as of early 20th century.

See also

Western Armenia
Wilsonian Armenia
Armenians in the Ottoman Empire
Ottoman Armenian population
Administration for Western Armenia
Kingdom of Armenia
Russian Armenia
Armenian genocide

References
Notes

Bibliography

Ottoman period in Armenia
19th century in Armenia
Western Armenia